Michael of Glasgow is the earliest known bishop of Glasgow of the 12th century. Records of his episcopate do not survive from the records of the Kingdom of Scotland, however a bishop and a bishop with the name Michael is recorded in foreign records. A letter of Ralph d'Escures, Archbishop of Canterbury (1114–22), to Pope Calixtus II, records that Thomas, Archbishop of York (1109–14), had ordained a bishop for the see of the "Britons of Glasgow". The bishop here is not named. However, Thomas Stubbs, a historian writing in the second half of the 14th century, tells us that Archbishop Thomas had ordained a man called Michael at the request of David, then Prince of the Cumbrians. Stubs informs us that Michael had dedicated churches in the diocese of York. According to Stubbs, Michael was buried in St Laurence's Church, Morland, Westmorland. It is possible that Michael was merely a nominal bishop, like the nominal York-appointed bishops of Orkney, whose main duties consisted of assisting the Archbishop of York in day-to-day duties.

References
Anderson, Alan Orr, Scottish Annals from English Chroniclers: AD 500–1286, (London, 1908), republished, Marjorie Anderson (ed.) (Stamford, 1991), pp. 133–4
Dowden, John, The Bishops of Scotland, ed. J. Maitland Thomson, (Glasgow, 1912), pp. 294–5

|-

11th-century births
12th-century deaths
Bishops of Glasgow
12th-century Scottish Roman Catholic bishops